This is a list of Egyptian and European colonial administrators (as well as leaders of the Mahdist State) responsible for the territory of the Turkish Sudan and the Anglo-Egyptian Sudan, an area equivalent to modern-day Sudan and South Sudan.

List

(Dates in italics indicate de facto continuation of office)

{| class="wikitable"
|- align=left
! Tenure
! width=60px|Portrait
! Incumbent
! Notes
|- valign=top
|colspan="4"|Turkish Sudan
|- valign=top
|November 1820 to 1821|| ||Isma`il Kamel Pasha, Commander||
|- valign=top
|April 1821 to September 1824|| ||Muhammad Bey Defterdar, Commander||
|- valign=top
|September 1824 to May 1825|| ||Osman Bey Jarkas, Commander||
|- valign=top
|May 1825 to March 1826|| ||Mahu Bey Urfali, Commander||
|- valign=top
|March 1826 to 1835||rowspan=2| ||Ali Khurshid Agha, Governor||
|- valign=top
|1835 to June 1838||Ali Khurshid Pasha, Hakimdar||Governor-General
|- valign=top
|June 1838 to 6 October 1843|| ||Ahmad Pasha abu Widan, Hakimdar||Governor-General
|- valign=top
|1843 to 1845|| ||Ahmad Pasha Manikli (Manliki), Hakimdar||Governor-General
|- valign=top
|1845 to 1850|| ||Khalid Khusraw Pasha, Hakimdar||Governor-General
|- valign=top
|1850 to January 1851|| ||'Abd al-Latif Pasha, Hakimdar||Governor-General
|- valign=top
|January 1851 to May 1852|| ||Rustum Pasha Jarkas, Hakimdar||Governor-General
|- valign=top
|May 1852 to 1853|| ||Isma'il Haqqi Pasha abu Jabal, Hakimdar||Governor-General
|- valign=top
|1853 to 1854|| ||Salim Pasha Sa'ib al-Jaza'irli, Hakimdar||Governor-General
|- valign=top
|July 1854 to November 1854|| ||Ali Pasha Sirri al-Arna'ut, Hakimdar||Governor-General
|- valign=top
|1854 to 1855|| ||Ali Pasha Jarkas, Governor||
|- valign=top
|1856 to 1858|| ||Arakil Bey al-Armani, Governor||
|- valign=top
|1859 to 1861|| ||Hasan Bey Salama Jarkas, Governor||
|- valign=top
|1861 to 1862|| ||Muhammad Rasikh Bey, Governor||
|- valign=top
|1862 to 1865|| ||Mūsā Pasha Ḥamdī, Hakimdar||Governor-General
|- valign=top
|1865 to November 1865|| ||'Umar Bey Fakhri, acting Hakimdar||acting Governor-General
|- valign=top
|November 1865 to 1866|| ||Ja'afar Pasha Sadiq, Hakimdar||Governor-General
|- valign=top
|1866 to 5 February 1871|| ||Ja'afar Pasha Mazhar, Hakimdar||Governor-General
|- valign=top
|5 February 1871 to October 1872|| ||Ahmad Mumtaz Pasha, Hakimdar||Governor-General
|- valign=top
|October 1872 to 1872|| ||Edhem Pasha al-Arifi at-Atqalawi, acting Hakimdar||acting Governor-General
|- valign=top
|1872 to 18 May 1877|| ||Isma'il Pasha al- Aiyub, Hakimdar||Governor-General
|- valign=top
|May 1877 to December 1879||||Charles George Gordon ("Gordon Pasha"), Hakimdar||Governor-General, 1st time
|- valign=top
|December 1879 to February 1882|| ||Muhammad Rauf Pasha, Hakimdar||Governor-General
|- valign=top
|4 March 1882 to 11 May 1882||||Carl Christian Giegler ("Giegler Pasha"), acting Hakimdar||acting Governor-General
|- valign=top
|May 1882 to March 1883|| ||'Abd al-Qadir Pasha Hilmi, Hakimdar||Governor-General
|- valign=top
|March 1883 to 5 November 1883|| ||'Ala al-Din Pasha Siddiq, Hakimdar||Governor-General
|- valign=top
|February 1884 to 18 February 1884|| ||Henry Watts Russell de Coetlogon, acting Hakimdar||acting Governor-General
|- valign=top
|18 February 1884 to 26 January 1885||||Charles George Gordon ("Gordon Pasha"), Hakimdar||Governor-General, 2nd time; Killed at the end of the Siege of Khartoum
|- valign=top
|26 January 1885 to 2 October 1898||colspan="3"|Territory of Turkish Sudan under complete control of Mahdiyah (Mahdist State)|- valign=top bgcolor=#C0C0C0
|colspan="4"|Mahdist State|- valign=top bgcolor=#C0C0C0
|29 June 1881 to 22 June 1885||||Muhammad Ahmad, Mahdi||Self-proclaimed Mahdi, Islamic Messiah
|- valign=top bgcolor=#C0C0C0
|22 June 1885 to 2 September 1898||||Abdallahi ibn Muhammad, Khalifa||Self-proclaimed Caliph, successor to Muhammad Ahmad; Defeated in the Battle of Omdurman, and later killed in the Battle of Umm Diwaykarat
|- valign=top
|colspan="4"|British Military Administration|- valign=top
|2 September 1898 to 19 January 1899||||Herbert Kitchener, 1st Earl Kitchener, Military Governor||Simultaneously served as Sirdar
|- valign=top
|colspan="4"|Anglo-Egyptian Sudan (condominium)
|- valign=top
|19 January 1899 to 22 December 1899||||Herbert Kitchener, 1st Earl Kitchener, Governor-General||Simultaneously served as Sirdar
|- valign=top
|22 December 1899 to 31 December 1916||||Sir Francis Reginald Wingate, Governor-General||Simultaneously served as Sirdar
|- valign=top
|1 January 1917 to 20 November 1924|| ||Sir Lee Oliver Fitzmaurice Stack, Governor-General||Simultaneously served as Sirdar; assassinated in Cairo
|- valign=top
|21 November 1924 to 5 January 1925|| ||, acting Governor-General||
|- valign=top
|5 January 1925 to 6 July 1926||||Sir Geoffrey Francis Archer, Governor-General||The first civilian Governor-General
|- valign=top
|31 October 1926 to 10 January 1934||||Sir John Loader Maffey, Governor-General||
|- valign=top
|10 January 1934 to 19 October 1940||||Sir George Stewart Symes, Governor-General||
|- valign=top
|19 October 1940 to 8 April 1947|| ||Sir Hubert Jervoise Huddleston, Governor-General||
|- valign=top
|8 April 1947 to 29 March 1954|| ||Sir Robert George Howe, Governor-General||
|- valign=top
|29 March 1954 to 12 December 1955||||Sir Alexander Knox Helm, Governor-General||
|- valign=top
|12 December 1955 to 1 January 1956|| ||Muhammad Ahmad Abu Rannat', acting Governor-General||Chief Justice of Sudan
|- valign=top
|1 January 1956||colspan="3"|Independence as Republic of the Sudan|}

For continuation after independence, see: ''List of heads of state of Sudan

See also
 Sudan
 Politics of Sudan
 List of heads of state of Sudan
 Vice President of Sudan
 List of heads of government of Sudan
 South Sudan
 Politics of South Sudan
 List of heads of state of South Sudan
 Vice President of South Sudan
 Lists of office-holders

References

External links
 World Statesmen – Sudan

History of Sudan
Anglo-Egyptian Sudan
Pre-independence governors
Pre-independence Sudan